Riboulet is a French surname. Notable people with the surname include:

Laurent Riboulet (1871–1960), French tennis player
Louis Riboulet (1871–1944), French pedagogue, writer, and professor
Mathieu Riboulet (born 1960), French writer and film director

French-language surnames